Smokeasy (also spelled smoke-easy or smokeeasy) is a term which came briefly into use in the wake of government-imposed smoking bans in businesses. It refers to bars and other venues that encourage evasion of the ban. The term has also been used to describe locations and events promoted by tobacco companies to avoid or evade bans on smoking. The word was added to the New Oxford American Dictionary in 2005, although it was used as early as 1978. It is a portmanteau of smoking and speakeasy. As smoking bans have become generally accepted, the term has fallen into disuse.

High levels of compliance with smoke-free laws have been reported in most jurisdictions including New York, Ireland, Italy and Scotland. Poor compliance was reported in Calcutta.

Tobacco companies and smokeasies

Tobacco companies have used a variety of tactics to encourage the sale and consumption of cigarettes in the presence of smoking bans, and the term smokeasy has commonly been used to describe events and establishments of this kind. Imperial Tobacco hires public venues to promote its Peter Stuyvesant brand. In Chicago, RJ Reynolds established an "upscale smoking lounge" serving alcohol and food, but classified as a retail tobacco store.

Examples

New York City
Within one month of the passage of New York City's smoking ban in 2003, smokeasies were quickly predicted. Shortly thereafter, some bartenders began to hear word of smokeasies and theorized that some former regulars who were smokers had switched to the smokeasies. 
By 2013, acceptance of the law was general, and enforcement actions had slowed to a trickle. .

Hawaii
In Hawaii, some establishments announced their intention to defy the statewide smoking ban, one of America's strictest, which went into effect on November 16, 2006. However, bans have been successively tightened over time.

The Netherlands
With the passing of a 2008 smoking ban, many Dutch cafes had become smokeasies despite facing fines up to 18,500 Euros.  Dutch pub owners viewed their defiance  organized a 1500-5000 owner strong public protest of the ban in November, 2008.

After two years of continued opposition by bar and cafe owners, in the fall of 2010 the Dutch government repealed the ban for smaller bars and cafes which had complained loudly about loss of business. The bans were reinstated and extended in 2018.

See also
List of smoking bans in the United States
Tobacco control

References

Drinking culture
Smoking
Tobacco control